St Andrew's Cathedral (Scottish Gaelic: Cathair-eaglais Naomh Anndra), or the Cathedral Church of Saint Andrew, is a cathedral of the Scottish Episcopal Church situated in the Scottish city of Aberdeen. It is the see of the Bishop of Aberdeen and Orkney, who is the Ordinary of the Diocese of Aberdeen and Orkney.

History
The cathedral is known as being the church where the first bishop of the Episcopal Church in the United States of America, Samuel Seabury was ordained in 1784. Bishop Seabury was consecrated to the episcopate in "an upper room" of the home of John Skinner, then leader of the St. Andrew's congregation, approx 500 meters from the present building. The approximate site of the house used to be marked by a polished granite tablet on the wall of the former Marischal College. This has, in recent years, been moved.

The original building was designed in the perpendicular Gothic style by the architect Archibald Simpson, one of Simpson's many commissions in the city. While three sides of the cathedral were built out of the usual local granite, for which Aberdeen is famous, the facade of the structure, facing King Street, was built from sandstone for economical reasons despite Simpson's opposition.

The church opened in 1817 as St Andrew's Chapel and was raised to cathedral status in 1914.

During the 1930s, the cathedral was renovated to commemorate the 150th anniversary of Seabury's consecration. There had been a plan to build an elaborate, cruciform cathedral with central tower, commemorating Bishop Seabury's consecration on the site currently occupied by Aberdeen City Council's headquarters. This was to have been a gift of the Episcopal Church in the United States of America, however, the Wall Street Crash halted this plan due to lack of money. Instead, the existing church was enlarged and embellished by Sir Ninian Comper. The memorial was dedicated with a ceremony attended by the then U.S. ambassador to the UK, Joseph P. Kennedy Sr.

Until the late 1970s and early 1980s, the cathedral was Anglo-Catholic in tradition. In 1982, the Cathedral Provost of the time, Very Revd Donald Howard, declared in a sermon the cathedral would remove the large crucifix and four of the six candles on the high altar for Lent so that the altar could be free-standing to permit a 'westward' celebration of the Eucharist, celebrant facing the congregation rather than back to the people. Worship has since become more "broad" in nature, whilst retaining the dignity of cathedral worship.

Financial and structural difficulties and 2020 closure

In April 2020, the church officials said that financial difficulties could mean that the cathedral might not re-open after the COVID-19 pandemic. In June 2020, Bishop Anne Dyer and the Cathedral Trustees and Chapter announced that the cathedral would close temporarily from September 2020, because of problems with the fabric of the building.

The congregation continued to gather for worship online from September 2020 to October 2021. In July 2021, the trustees made a Vision Statement that the cathedral will reopen for worship on Advent Sunday 2021

Reopened for Advent 2021 
On Sunday, 5 December 2021, the cathedral reopened for worship to a grand inaugural service of Advent Carols. The congregation continued to gather for worship on Sundays at 10.45am and on Thursdays at 10am.

List of provosts

 Andrew Jaffray
 James Milne
 1735–1774: William Smith
 John Skinner
 William Skinner
 Stephen Allen
 John Ryde
 Thomas Suther
 Henry Ley Greaves
 1882–1909: Myers Danson
 1910–1912: William Perry
 1914–1932: Henry Erskine Hill
 1932–1955: Gordon Kinnell
 1955–1965: Paddy Shannon
 1965–1978: Arthur Hodgkinson
 1978–1991: Donald Howard
 1991–2002: David Wightman
 2003–2015: Richard Kilgour
 2015–present: Isaac Poobalan

Organ and organists

The cathedral, which has a splendid acoustic, houses one of the finest three manual pipe organs in Scotland, and has been served by a number of distinguished organists and masters of the choristers including:

George Trash
John Cullen
Richard Galloway
Frederick ("Bill") Fea
David McGinnigle
Geoffrey Pearce 1978 – 1983 (afterwards organist of Bridlington Priory) and Selby Abbey
Professor Andrew Morrisson 1983 – 2020
Christopher Cromar 2020–2021

Cathedral canons

Revd Canon Captain Gerry Bowyer

Revd Canon Neil Brice

Revd Canon Vittoria Hancock

Revd Canon Jeremy Paisey

Revd Canon John Walker

See also
Religion in Scotland
St Machar's Cathedral — the original cathedral in Aberdeen, now a High Kirk of the Church of Scotland
St Mary's Cathedral — cathedral of the Roman Catholic Diocese of Aberdeen

References

Aberdeen
 
Category A listed buildings in Aberdeen
Listed cathedrals in Scotland